John Alexander Ogonowski (February 24, 1951 – September 11, 2001) was an American pilot and an agricultural activist. A resident of Dracut, Massachusetts, Ogonowski was a leading advocate on behalf of farming in Massachusetts, particularly in aiding immigrant farmers from Cambodia, whom he assisted as part of the New Entry Sustainable Farming Project. He was the pilot of American Airlines Flight 11, which was hijacked by terrorists and flown into the North Tower of the World Trade Center as part of the September 11 attacks.

Biography
John Alexander Ogonowski was born February 24, 1951, in Lowell, Massachusetts, where he was raised. He attended St. Stanislaus School, Keith Academy in Lowell. He attended Lowell Technological Institute (now the University of Massachusetts Lowell), where he was a member of the Pi Lambda Phi fraternity. He graduated in 1972 with a bachelor of science degree in Nuclear Engineering.

Ogonowski was a pilot in the U. S. Air Force during the Vietnam War, assigned to Charleston Air Force Base, South Carolina, ferrying equipment to Asia and sometimes transporting the bodies of fallen in C-141 transport aircraft. Following his service commitment, he resigned his commission under honorable conditions and separated  from the military with the rank of captain.

Ogonowski became a commercial pilot in 1978. For 23 years, he flew airplanes for American Airlines, and was a member of the Allied Pilot Association. Ogonowski had joined the airline as a flight engineer after serving in the Air Force during the Vietnam War, when he flew C-141 transport planes back and forth across the Pacific. Some of his return flights bore flag-draped coffins.

During the course of his commercial piloting career, he met Margaret, a flight attendant who went by the nickname "Peggy", whom he later married.

Ogonowski was also an avid farmer, who secured 150 acres of farmland on Marsh Hill Road in Dracut through the federal Agriculture Preservation Restriction program. He raised hay, corn, pumpkins, blueberries, and peaches. He was a leading advocate for farming in Massachusetts, particularly in aiding immigrant farmers from Cambodia.

September 11 attacks
Ogonowski and his co-pilot were killed on September 11, 2001, while at the controls during the hijacking of American Airlines Flight 11.   Following his murder, the airplane was crashed into the North Tower of the World Trade Center.

Legacy
Ogonowski was survived by his wife Margaret and daughters Laura, Caroline, and Mary Catherine. His younger brother, Jim Ogonowski, who is also an agricultural activist, made an unsuccessful run for the United States House of Representatives in 2007.

In 2002, Ogonowski and Flight 11 flight attendants Betty Ong and Madeline Amy Sweeney were the inaugural recipients of the Madeline Amy Sweeney Award for Civilian Bravery, an honor that the Government of Massachusetts instituted to award annually at least one Massachusetts resident for displaying extraordinary courage in defending or saving the lives of others.

A remote controlled model aircraft flying field in nearby Tewksbury, Massachusetts, was dedicated to Ogonowski.

The University of Massachusetts Lowell, presented Ogonowski with a posthumous honorary doctorate at its 2003 commencement ceremony at Tsongas Arena.

The USAID Farmer to Farmer program was renamed the "John Ogonowski and Doug Bereuter FTF Program" as part of the 2008 Farm Bill.

At the National 9/11 Memorial, Ogonowski is memorialized at the North Pool, on Panel N-74, adjacent to the name of Kathleen A. Nicosia, a friend and flight attendant also killed on board American Airlines Flight 11 that day.

See also

 Charles Burlingame
 LeRoy Homer Jr.

References

External links

Captain John Ogonowski at Legacy.com
 

American Airlines Flight 11 victims
1951 births
2001 deaths
American people of Polish descent
Aviators killed in aviation accidents or incidents in the United States
University of Massachusetts Lowell alumni
American terrorism victims
United States Air Force officers
United States Air Force personnel of the Vietnam War
People from Dracut, Massachusetts
Deaths by stabbing in New York (state)
Male murder victims
Commercial aviators
Military personnel from Massachusetts